Shankar Guha Niyogi (14 February 1943 – 28 September 1991) was an Indian labor leader who was the founder of the Chhattisgarh Mukti Morcha, a labor union run in the town of Dalli Rajhara Mines in Chhattisgarh, India.

Niyogi was founder of Chhattisgarh Mukti Morcha, a political party for his vision towards labour of Rajhara Mines. 

Niyogi was shot and killed while asleep on 28 September 1991. The trial of his murder suspects generated tremendous controversy, as a lower court awarded strict punishments to all suspects, but higher courts later convicted just one suspect, and let off two industrialists.

References

External links

 "Niyogi - His Work & Thinking"
 The five-legged elephant
 Shankar Guha Niyogi and Chhattisgarh Mukti Morcha Documents Archive

Trade unionists from Chhattisgarh
1991 deaths
1943 births